The 2011 CONCACAF U-17 Championship determined the four CONCACAF representatives to advance to the 2011 FIFA U-17 World Cup in Mexico. Jamaica staged the championship between 14 and 27 February. 

The United States defeated Canada 3–0 in the final to claim their third championship.

Qualified teams

Mexico did not participate.

Squads

Draw
The draw for the final tournament took place on December 15 in Montego Bay, Jamaica, dividing the 12 sides into four, three-team groups.

Due to a decision of the CONCACAF Youth Championships Committee, Pot 1 was reconfigured from the original announcement. Honduras, which had qualified for each of the previous two World Cups, will replace Canada in Pot 1, which also will include the United States, host Jamaica and Costa Rica.

Canada was moved to Pot 2 with Central American sides El Salvador, Guatemala and Panama.

Venues
The tournament was hosted in two host cities.
Trelawny was dropped after an inspection by CONCACAF four days before the tournament was due to begin, because there was no grass.

Group stage
All times are local time – UTC−05:00

Group A

1 Haiti could not field a team for the match against El Salvador due to player illness; El Salvador was awarded with a 3–0 win.

Group B

Group C

CONCACAF held a draw tiebreaker to determine the group winner, which was won by Jamaica.

Group D

Knockout stage

All times are local time – UTC−05:00

Quarter-finals

Semi-finals

Third place match

Final

Winners 

The U.S. has won the CONCACAF championship twice at this level, in 1983 and 1992, but because those were U-16 events, the U.S. has technically never won the CONCACAF U-17 Championship. When the qualifying tournament was held as two groups in separate venues, the U.S. won its group three times (2001, 2003, 2005).

Goalscorers

 4 goals
  John Jairo Ruiz
  Jason Wright
  Andrew Oliver

 3 goals
  Keven Alemán
  Michael Petrasso

 2 goals
  Chris Nanco
  Gerardo Iraheta
  Bryan Róchez
  Shackeil Henry
  Alfred Koroma
  Marc Pelosi

 1 goal
  Zari Prescod
  Wesley Cain
  Luca Gasparotto
  Sadi Jalali
  Gabriel Leiva
  William Quirós
  Frank López
  Rommel Mejía
  José Peña
  Johnley Chéry
  Eder Yair Velásquez
  Andre Lewis
  Omar Browne
  Alfredo Stephens
  Adan Noel
  Alejandro Guido
  Mario Rodríguez
  Stevie Rodriguez
  Nathan Smith

Countries to participate in 2011 FIFA U-17 World Cup
The top four teams qualified for the 2011 FIFA U-17 World Cup.

References

External links
 CONCACAF.com – Official website

 
2011
Under
2011
C
2011 in youth association football